Turkey sent a team to compete at the 2008 Summer Olympics in Beijing, China. In total, 67 Turkish athletes went to Beijing, including 19 women.

Medalists

| width=78% align=left valign=top |

| width=22% align=left valign=top |

Competitors

Archery

Athletics

Men
Track & road events

Field events

Women
Track & road events

Field events

Boxing

Cycling

Mountain biking

Judo

Sailing

Men

Women

Open

M = Medal race; EL = Eliminated – did not advance into the medal race;

Shooting

Men

Swimming

Men

Women

Table tennis

Taekwondo

Weightlifting

Men

Women

Wrestling

Men's freestyle

Men's Greco-Roman

See also
 Turkey at the 2008 Summer Paralympics

References 

Nations at the 2008 Summer Olympics
2008
Summer Olympics